Santa María del Oro may refer to the following locations in Mexico:

 Santa María del Oro, Nayarit, a municipality and town
 Santa María del Oro, Durango, a town in the municipality of El Oro
 Santa María del Oro, Jalisco, a town in the municipality of Manuel M. Dieguez

See also
 Fray Justo Santa María del Oro Department, Chaco Province, Argentina